The Russell Institute is a building in Paisley, Scotland.

History
The building was donated by Agnes Russell to the Burgh of Paisley. It was built as a memorial to her two brothers, Thomas and Robert Russell, who died in 1913 and 1920 respectively. The building was originally a child welfare clinic and is used as a multi-purpose training facility by Renfrewshire Council today. It is protected as a category A listed building.

See also
List of Category A listed buildings in Renfrewshire
List of listed buildings in Paisley, Renfrewshire

References

External links

Buildings and structures in Paisley, Renfrewshire
Category A listed buildings in Renfrewshire
Buildings and structures completed in 1927
1927 establishments in Scotland